The Sagebrush Lady is a 1925 American silent Western film directed by Horace B. Carpenter and starring Eileen Sedgwick, Ben Corbett, and Jack Richardson.

Plot
As described in a film magazine review, Harmony Hayden, a government agent, arrives in the area in disguise to check the operation of cattle rustlers around Paula Loring's ranch. His identity is not suspected by the local people. Neighboring rancherman Tom Doyle schemes to marry Paula. The young woman saves Harmony from being lynched after being suspected of being a holdup man after he said that he was her fiance. Tom Doyle's foreman is foiled by Harmony in an attempt to kidnap Paula. Having broken up the gang, Harmony remains after becoming Paula's husband.

Cast
 Eileen Sedgwick as Paula Loring
 Ben Corbett as Doyle's Foreman
 Jack Richardson as Tom Doyle
 Eddie Barry as Harmony Hayden
 William Steele as Sheriff Martin

References

Bibliography
 Connelly, Robert B. The Silents: Silent Feature Films, 1910-36, Volume 40, Issue 2. December Press, 1998.
 Munden, Kenneth White. The American Film Institute Catalog of Motion Pictures Produced in the United States, Part 1. University of California Press, 1997.

External links
 

1925 films
1925 Western (genre) films
American silent feature films
Silent American Western (genre) films
American black-and-white films
Films directed by Horace B. Carpenter
Chesterfield Pictures films
1920s English-language films
1920s American films